Usdibad (566–567) was a Gepid military commander (dux) and fugitive that received refuge by Byzantine Emperor Justin II (r. 565–574) during the Lombard–Gepid War (567).

In 566, Lombard king Alboin concluded a treaty with the Pannonian Avars, to whom he promised the Gepids' land in case they won over them. The Gepids were destroyed by the Avars and Lombards in 567. Gepid king Cunimund was killed by Alboin himself. The Avars now occupied "Gepidia", forming the Avar Khaganate. The Byzantine Emperor intervened and took control of Sirmium (now Sremska Mitrovica, Serbia), also giving refuge to Gepid leader Usdibad, but the rest of Gepidia was taken by the Avars. According to István Bóna, Usdibad was probably a secret rival of Cunimund, and crossed the Sava to the Byzantines after the defeat.

Annotations

References

Sources

Gepid warriors
6th-century Gothic people
6th-century soldiers
6th-century Byzantine military personnel
6th-century births
6th-century deaths